Tartus District is a district of the Tartus Governorate in northwestern Syria. The administrative centre is the city of Tartus. At the 2004 census, the district had a population of 283,571.

Sub-districts
The district of Tartus is divided into seven sub-districts or nawāḥī (population as of 2004):
Tartus Subdistrict (ناحية طرطوس): population 162,980.
Arwad Subdistrict (ناحية أرواد): population 4,403.
Al-Hamidiyah Subdistrict (ناحية الحميدية): population 20,309.
Khirbet al-Maazah Subdistrict (ناحية خربة المعزة): population 22,897.
Al-Sawda Subdistrict (ناحية السودا): population 32,295.
Al-Karimah Subdistrict (ناحية الكريمة): population 17,271.
Al-Safsafah Subdistrict (ناحية صفصافة): population 23,416.

References